Fisher Caldera, also known as Mount Fisher and Fisher Volcano, is a large volcanic caldera, measuring about  by , located on Unimak Island in the Aleutian Islands of Alaska. Fisher Caldera is located just  from the Mount Westdahl volcano.

The largest volcanic eruption on Earth during the Holocene Epoch (the last 11,700 years) occurred at Fisher Caldera in 8700 BCE.

References

External links

See also

 List of volcanic craters in Alaska
 List of volcanoes in the United States

Volcanoes of Alaska
Unimak Island
Volcanoes of Aleutians East Borough, Alaska
VEI-6 volcanoes
Calderas of Alaska
Stratovolcanoes of the United States
Holocene calderas